This is a timeline of the history of Calgary.

18th century
1787 – Cartographer David Thompson spent the winter with a band of Peigan encamped along the Bow River. He was the first recorded European to visit the area.

19th century
1870 – The future site of Calgary becomes part of Canada and of the North-West Territories.
1873 – John Glenn was the first documented European settler in the Calgary area.
1875 – Originally named Fort Brisebois, after NWMP officer Éphrem-A. Brisebois, it was renamed Fort Calgary by Colonel James Macleod.
1877 – Treaty 7 is signed, and title to the Fort Calgary area is ceded to the Crown.
1882 - First sawmill on the Bow River 
1883 – The Canadian Pacific Railway reached the area and a rail station was constructed.
1884 – Calgary was officially incorporated as a town and elected its first mayor, George Murdoch.
1885 – Calgary Police Service established.
1886 – The Calgary Fire of 1886.
1888 – Anglican Diocese of Calgary established.
1891 – Calgary and Edmonton Railway opened.
1894 – It was incorporated as "The City of Calgary" in what was then the North-West Territories.
1900 – Downtown East Village, Calgary established.

20th century
1910 – Parkdale is annexed to the City of Calgary. 
1910 - the 103rd Calgary Rifles is created
1912 – The Calgary Stampede is held for the first time.
1915–18 – The Mewata Armouries are constructed.
1919 - The Victory Stampede was Calgary's second rodeo, honoring the end of the Great War.
1920 - the 103rd Rifles is reorganized as The Calgary Regiment
1923 – The Calgary Stampede held for the third time and annually since then.
1924 - The Calgary Highlanders split from the Calgary Regiment to become its own regiment
1932–33 – The Glenmore Dam is constructed.
1945 - The current Calgary Stampeders of the Canadian Football League begin play.
1947 – Stampede Wrestling established.
1948 - The Calgary Regiment renamed The King's Own Calgary Regiment
1967 – Construction of the Husky Tower started.  Opened to the public on June 30, 1968.
1970 – First +15 enclosed pedestrian walkway constructed downtown.
1980 - The NHL's Calgary Flames begin play after relocating from Atlanta
1984 – Suncor Energy Centre completed construction and becomes the new tallest building in Calgary.
1988 – Calgary hosts the 1988 Winter Olympics.
1989 – Bankers Hall-East completed construction.
1989 – The Flames win the Stanley Cup, the only time a visiting team has won the Stanley Cup in Montreal.
1992 – Stephen Avenue is designated as a National Historic Site of Canada.
1996 – Canadian Pacific Railway moves its head office from Montreal to Calgary.
1997 – Calgary Declaration
1999 – Hub Oil explosion
2000 – Bankers Hall-West is completed 11 years after its twin.

21st century
2002 – J26 G8 Protests
2007 – 1,020,000 residents
2010 – After 26 years the Suncor Energy Centre is surpassed by The Bow as tallest building in Calgary.
2011 – Eighth Avenue Place I completed construction.
2013 – Widespread flooding across southern Alberta forces the evacuation of 75,000 Calgary residents
2018 – Brookfield Place East is completed and becomes the new tallest building in Calgary.

List of riots and civil unrest in Calgary 
The following is a timeline of riots and civil unrest in Calgary, Alberta. Since its incorporation as a town in 1884, like other cities, Calgary has had to deal with a variety of violence. Calgary has been credited with maintaining relative civility during duress. The Great Depression in Canada has received particular attention from sociologists and historians, including Thomas Thorner and Neil Watson who wrote, "There is little question that Calgary experienced its share of civil strife during the Depression. Battles between police and the single unemployed men, full scale riots and threats to blow up public buildings appear to have been almost annual events." According to Stephen Graham, a Professor of Human Geography at Durham University, recent events have seen the City of Calgary change their tactics towards civil unrest activities such as protests.

Events

List of localities annexed 
Through its various annexations, the following localities are now located in Calgary.

Academy
Albert Park
Altadore
Barlow
Barlow Junction
Beddington
Bel-Aire
Bowness
Brentwood
Brickburn
Bridgeland
Britannia
Calgary International Airport
Cambrian Heights
Camp Sarcee
Capitol Hill
Charleswood
Collingwood
Eagle Ridge
Forest Lawn
Glamorgan
Glenbrook
Glengarry
Haysboro
Heritage Woods Subdivision
Hillhurst
Hubalta
Inglewood
Keith
Killarney
Kingsland
Lincoln Park
Lynnwood
Manchester
Midnapore
Montgomery
Mount Royal
Mount View
North Haven
Ogden
Parkdale
Princes Island
Renfrew
Rideau Park
Rosscarrock
Roxboro
Sarcee Junction
Shepard
Silver Springs
Simons Valley
Southwood
Spruce Cliff
Spruce Meadows
St. Andrews Heights
St. Georges Heights
St. George's Island
St. Patrick's Island
Stanley Park
Sunalta
Thorncliffe
Turner
Tuxedo Park
Windsor Park

See also 
 List of conflicts in Canada

Notes

History of Calgary
Timelines of cities in Canada